Boomerang is a 1934 British drama film directed by Arthur Maude and starring Lester Matthews, Nora Swinburne, and Harvey Braban. It was made at Walton Studios.

Cast
 Lester Matthews as David Kennedy  
 Nora Swinburne as Elizabeth Stafford 
 Harvey Braban 
 Wallace Geoffrey 
 Charles Mortimer 
 Millicent Wolf

References

Bibliography
 Low, Rachael. Filmmaking in 1930s Britain. George Allen & Unwin, 1985.
 Wood, Linda. British Films, 1927-1939. British Film Institute, 1986.

External links

1934 films
British drama films
1934 drama films
Films shot at Nettlefold Studios
Films directed by Arthur Maude
Quota quickies
British black-and-white films
Films with screenplays by John Paddy Carstairs
1930s English-language films
1930s British films